Saint-Amant may refer to:

People

Pierre Charles Fournier de Saint-Amant (1800–1872), French chess player
Antoine Girard de Saint-Amant (1594–1661), French poet

Places
St. Amant, Louisiana, United States
communes in France:
Saint-Amant, Charente, in the Charente  département 
Saint-Amant-de-Boixe, in the Charente  département
Saint-Amant-de-Bonnieure, in the Charente  département 
Saint-Amant-de-Nouère, in the Charente  département   
Saint-Amant-Roche-Savine, in the Puy-de-Dôme  département 
Saint-Amant-Tallende, in the Puy-de-Dôme  département

Other
St. Amant (horse), winner of the 1904 Epsom Derby.
St. Amant Winery, located in Woodbridge, CA.
St. Amant's, hotel/restaurant/marina, Britt, Ontario.

See also
Saint-Amand (disambiguation)
Saint-Amans (disambiguation)
Saint Amand